Ozark Township may refer to:

 Ozark Township, Polk County, Arkansas, in Polk County, Arkansas
 Ozark Township, Sharp County, Arkansas, in Sharp County, Arkansas
 Ozark Township, Anderson County, Kansas
 Ozark Township, Barry County, Missouri
 Ozark Township, Barton County, Missouri
 Ozark Township, Lawrence County, Missouri
 Ozark Township, Oregon County, Missouri
 Ozark Township, Texas County, Missouri
 Ozark Township, Webster County, Missouri

	
Township name disambiguation pages